Wilhelm "Willi" Fischer (born 26 August 1972, in Frankfurt am Main) is a German former professional boxer. As an amateur he competed at the 1992 Summer Olympics. He challenged once for the WBO heavyweight title in 1998. He retired with a record of 37 wins (24 by knockout), 6 losses, and 1 draw.

Professional career
Fischer made his professional debut in July 1995, a draw. He soon amassed a record of 11-0-1 and captured the German International Heavyweight title, before facing then 17–0 fellow German Kim Weber in October 1996, in a battle for Fischer's international German as well as the vacant Germany BDB Heavyweight title. Fischer lost via unanimous decision.

Fischer would bounce back however, winning his next 10 fights to amass a 21–1–1 record. He was then awarded a title shot for the WBO heavyweight title in September 1998 against then-champion Herbie Hide. Fischer lost via a late-round TKO.

Fischer won his next four before facing Kim Weber in a rematch for the German International (BDB) Heavyweight title, winning via majority decision. Fischer was then set to fight Timo Hoffmann for both Fischer's title and Hoffman's Germany BDB Heavyweight title in May 2000. Fischer lost via unanimous decision. After also dropping his next fight to 9-0 Rene Monse for the vacant International BDB title, Fischer would go 11–2 in his last 13 fights, the pair of losses being in bouts for the Germany BDB Heavyweight titles in 2003 and 2004. Fischer retired in 2009.

Professional boxing record

References
 

1972 births
Living people
Sportspeople from Frankfurt
Heavyweight boxers
Super-heavyweight boxers
Boxers at the 1992 Summer Olympics
Olympic boxers of Germany
German male boxers